TCG Gayret may refer to one of the following Turkish Navy ships:

 , a  ordered from the United Kingdom just prior to World War II; after the outbreak of that war, ship was purchased by the Royal Navy and renamed HMS Ithuriel (H05); damaged beyond repair by German air attack in Algeria in November 1942; never served in the Turkish Navy
 , the former British O-class destroyer HMS Oribi (G66); acquired by the Turkish Navy in 1946; scrapped in 1965
 , the former American  USS Eversole (DD-789) acquired by the Turkish Navy in 1973; struck in 1995; currently a museum ship at İzmit, Turkey

Turkish Navy ship names